Brenda J. Thiam (born September 9, 1969) is an American politician from Maryland and a member of the Republican Party. She was a member of the Maryland House of Delegates from District 2B, which covers parts of Washington County, from 2020 to 2023. Her appointment to the seat was announced on September 23, 2020, filling the vacancy created when Paul D. Corderman was appointed to the Maryland Senate. She was sworn in on October 6, 2020.

Career
Thiam was a successful candidate for Hagerstown city council in the nonpartisan 2020 primary. Thiam announced her withdrawal from the race, but she remained on the ballot for the 2020 general election.

Thiam is a behavioral health specialist. She has a post-doctorate certificate in applied behavior analysis from Penn State; a doctorate in special education leadership from Capella University; a master's degree in education/special education from the University of Maryland; and a bachelor's degree in physical education from North Carolina Central University.

In the legislature
Thiam was sworn into the Maryland House of Delegates on October 6, 2020. She is the first Black Republican woman to serve in the Maryland General Assembly and the first Black Republican to serve in the legislature in nearly three decades after Aris T. Allen died in office in 1991.

Thiam ran for election in 2022, seeking a full term in the Maryland House of Delegates. She won the Republican primary election on July 19, 2022, but was defeated by Democratic challenger Brooke Grossman in the general election on November 8.

Personal life
Thiam is married and has a daughter. She says she changed her voter registration from the Democratic Party to the Republican Party in 2012.

Election results
 2020 Hagerstown City Council primary
{| class="wikitable"
|+Non-Partisan Candidates - Vote for up to 5
|-
!Name !! Total !! Percentage !! Outcome
|-
| Kristin B. Aleshire || 3,762 || 13.20% || Won
|-
| Shelley McIntire || 3,052 || 10.70% || Won
|-
| Bob Bruchey || 2,517 ||   8.80% || Won
|-
| Tiara Burnett || 2,513 ||   8.80% || Won
|-
| Penny May Nigh || 2,451 ||   8.60% || Won
|-
| Brenda J. Thiam || 2,420 ||   8.50% || Won
|-
| Peter E. Perini, Sr. || 2,021 ||   7.10% || Won
|-
| Austin Heffernan || 1,990 ||   7.00% || Won
|-
| Tekesha A. Martinez || 1,972 ||   6.90% || Won
|-
| Brooke Grossman || 1,907 ||   6.70% || Won
|-
| Chip Snyder || 1,825 ||   6.40% ||
|-
| Matthew J. Schindler || 1,586 ||   5.50% ||
|-
| Travis Aaron Sites ||    585 ||   2.00% ||
|}

References

21st-century American women politicians
African-American state legislators in Maryland
Capella University alumni
Living people
Maryland Democrats
Maryland Republicans
Members of the Maryland House of Delegates
North Carolina Central University alumni
Pennsylvania State University alumni
Politicians from Hagerstown, Maryland
University of Maryland, College Park alumni
Women state legislators in Maryland
1969 births
21st-century American politicians
21st-century African-American women
21st-century African-American politicians
20th-century African-American people
20th-century African-American women